Following is a List of senators of Mayenne, people who have represented the department of Mayenne in the Senate of France.

Third Republic

Fourth Republic

Fifth Republic

References

 
Mayenne